Cristian Jesús Martínez (born 6 February 1997) is a Panamanian footballer who plays as a midfielder for Saudi Arabian club Najran and the Panama national team.

Career

Chorrillo
Martínez joined the youth team of his local side Chorrillo at the age of 8, eventually joining the club's first team in 2012.

Columbus Crew
Martínez signed on loan with Major League Soccer side Columbus Crew on 17 May 2016. Martínez made his MLS debut on June 1, 2016, coming on as a substitute in a 3-2 loss to Philadelphia Union. He scored in the 90+3', becoming the youngest Crew SC goal scorer in a regular-season match in club history. Martínez would be loaned by Crew SC to Pittsburgh Riverhounds, the club's USL affiliate. He made his Riverhounds debut against FC Montreal on August 10, 2016. Crew SC would recall Martínez for two more appearances at the end of the MLS season. On January 25, 2017 Martínez was acquired on a permanent transfer. On May 4, 2017, Martínez was loaned to United Soccer League club FC Cincinnati. He played in one game before returning to Columbus Crew on May 8.

The club declined Martinez's contract option following the 2018 season, ending his time in Columbus after three years, 31 total appearances, and three goals.

Chicago Fire
On 12 December 2018, Martínez was selected by Chicago Fire in the MLS Waiver Draft.

On 24 August 2019, Martínez joined USL Championship side Las Vegas Lights on loan for the remainder of the season.

Cádiz
On January 18, 2020, Cádiz CF announced his signing until 2022 and that he would be loaned to a Segunda División B team. On January 24 it was made official that that team would be Recreativo de Huelva.

On January 30, 2021, Cádiz CF announced his six-month loan to CD Plaza Amador of Panama.

Najran
On 20 January 2023, Martínez joined Saudi Arabian club Najran.

International career
In May 2018 he was named in Panama's preliminary 35 man squad for the 2018 World Cup in Russia. However, he did not make the final 23.

References

External links

 
 
 

1997 births
Living people
Panamanian footballers
Sportspeople from Panama City
Association football midfielders
Unión Deportivo Universitario players
Columbus Crew players
Pittsburgh Riverhounds SC players
FC Cincinnati (2016–18) players
Chicago Fire FC players
Las Vegas Lights FC players
Cádiz CF B players
Recreativo de Huelva players
C.D. Plaza Amador players
Monagas S.C. players
Najran SC players
Liga Panameña de Fútbol players
Major League Soccer players
USL Championship players
Segunda División B players
Venezuelan Primera División players
Saudi First Division League players
Panama international footballers
Panama under-20 international footballers
Panamanian expatriate footballers
Expatriate soccer players in the United States
Panamanian expatriate sportspeople in the United States
Expatriate footballers in Spain
Panamanian expatriate sportspeople in Spain
Expatriate footballers in Venezuela
Panamanian expatriate sportspeople in Venezuela
Expatriate footballers in Saudi Arabia
Panamanian expatriate sportspeople in Saudi Arabia